The Malinovka is a small river in Perm Krai, a right tributary of the Mulyanka. The source of Malinovka is situated in Industrialny City District of Perm. It flows in South direction. It is about 1.6 kilometers long.

References 
  Малиновка на карте Перми.

Rivers of Perm Krai